Mike Fraboni (born June 5, 1948, in Hibbing, Minnesota, United States) is an American curler.

He works at Madison Curling Club as a curling ice maker.

Teams

Men's

Mixed

References

External links
 

Living people
1948 births
Sportspeople from Hibbing, Minnesota
Sportspeople from Madison, Wisconsin
American male curlers
American curling champions
Continental Cup of Curling participants